Marc Bell (born 1971 in London, Ontario) is a Canadian cartoonist and artist. He was initially known for creating comic strips (such as Shrimpy and Paul), but Bell has also created several exhibitions of his mixed media work and watercoloured drawings. Hot Potatoe [sic], a monograph of his work, was released in 2009. His comics have appeared in many Canadian weeklies, Vice, and LA Weekly.  He has been published in numerous anthologies, such as Kramers Ergot and The Ganzfeld.

Publications
Boof, 1992, Caliber Press (Plymouth, MI)
Hep, 1993, Caliber Press (Plymouth, MI)
The Mojo Action Companion Unit Vol.2 #1, 1997, Exclaim! (Toronto, ON)
Shrimpy and Paul and Friends, 2003, Highwater Books (Brooklyn, NY)
Worn Tuff Elbow #1, 2004, Fantagraphics (Seattle, WA)
The Stacks, 2004, Drawn & Quarterly (Montreal, PQ)
The Hobbit (with Peter Thompson), 2005, PictureBox (Brooklyn, NY)
Fresh From Kiev, 2005, Bulb Comix (Geneva, CH)
Nog a Dod (editor), 2006, Conundrum Press (Montreal, PQ) in association with PictureBox
Ganzfeld #5 (editor), 2007, PictureBox (Brooklyn, NY)
Illusztraijuns for Brain Police [sic], 2008, Drawn & Quarterly/Half World Books (Montreal, PQ)
Hot Potatoe [sic], 2009, Drawn & Quarterly (Montreal, PQ)
Kelp Stingray (with Matthew Thurber), 2009, Nieves (Zurich, CH)
Shrimpy et Paul, 2010, Editions Cornélius (Paris, FR)
Dirty Dishes (editor) by Amy Lockhart, 2010, Drawn & Quarterly (Montreal, PQ)
Pure Pajamas, 2011, Drawn & Quarterly (Montreal, PQ)
Shrimpy e Paul, 2012, A Bolha Editora (Rio de Janeiro, BR)
Rudy (editor) by Mark Connery, 2014, 2D Cloud (Minneapolis, MN)
Love and Forgiveness (editor) by Joe Hale, 2014, Swimmers Group (Toronto, ON)
Boutique Mag #1, 2014, Colour Code Printing (Toronto, ON)
Stroppy, 2015, Drawn & Quarterly (Montreal, PQ)
18 Sausages (Boutique Mag #3), 2018, No World Books, (Vancouver, BC)
Stroppy, 2018, Editions Cornelius, (Bordeaux, FR)
Stroppy, 2018, La Cúpula and Hotel De La Ideas, (Barcelona, SP) and (Buenos Aires, AR)
Worn Tuff Elbow #2, 2018, No World Books (Vancouver, BC)
Boutique Mag #4, 2019, No World Books and Neoglyphic Media (Bellingham, WA)
Banal Complications, 2020, mini kuš! #90 (Riga, Latvia)
Boutique Mag #5, 2022, Neoglyphic Media (Bellingham, WA)

Anthology work
Rosetta, "He Works Inside the Condiment Dispenser", 2002, Alternative Comics (Gainesville, FL), four endflaps on covers
L’enfance Dub Cyclope 2, "Il N’Y A Pas D’Issue!", Zone Convective (Montreal PQ), 10 pages (French translation)
The Ganzfeld #3, "The DUHY Science Network", 2003, Monday Morning (New York, NY), 6 pages
Kramers Ergot #4, "There is No Escape!", 2003, Avodah Books (Los Angeles, CA), 23 pages
Kramers Ergot #5, "Fallen Angel" (plus other assorted material), 2004, Gingko Press (Corte Madera, CA), 26 pages
Black #3, "Le Royaume Sacre de Shrimpy", 2005, Coconino Press (Paris, France), 22 pages (French translation)
The Ganzfeld #4, "Gustun on These Layers of the Earth", 2005, PictureBox (Brooklyn, NY), 14 pages
Kramers Ergot #6, "Pile of Bacon", 2006, Buenaventura Press and Avodah Books (Los Angeles, CA), 12 pages
An Anthology of Graphic Fiction, Cartoons, & True Stories, "Supernatural Hot Rug and not Used #1", 2006, Yale University Press (New Haven, CT), 3 pages
The Ganzfeld #7, "A History of the All-Star Schnauzer Band", 2007, PictureBox (Brooklyn, NY), 6 pages
The Where, the Why, and the How, "What Drives Plate Platonics", 2012, Chronicle Books (San Francisco, CA), 1 page
Drawn & Quarterly 25th Anniversary, "Shrimpy is in Trouble", 2015, Drawn & Quarterly (Montreal, PQ), 2 pages
Kramers Ergot #9 by Marc Bell (a) and Joe Hale (w), "Calendar", 2016, Fantagraphics Books (Seattle, WA), 1 page
s! #26 (dADa), "Still Kicking", 2016, kuš!, (Riga, Latvia), 4 pages
Kramers Ergot #10, "Slogan Schnauzer", 2019, Fantagraphics Books (Seattle, WA), 10 pages

Solo exhibitions
2002. Calm Center, The Blinding Light!! Cinema, Vancouver, BC
2004. The Stacks, Adam Baumgold Gallery, New York, NY
2005. Bloo Chip, Adam Baumgold Gallery, New York, NY
2007. Egypt Buncake, Adam Baumgold Gallery, New York, NY
2008. Illusztraijuns For Brain Police, Librairie Drawn & Quarterly, Montreal, QC
2008. Illustrated Cartoon Videos, Paul Bright Gallery, Toronto, ON
2009. Hot Potatoe, Adam Baumgold Gallery, New York, NY
2010. Did Yoo See The Exhibition Of The Chunky Floors?, Owens Art Gallery, Mount Allison University, Sackville, NB
2010. Modurn Mithoes, Lambiek, Amsterdam, NL
2011. Honk If You Pay Throo the Schnozz, Rodman Hall, Brock University, St. Catharines, ON
2013. Ornate Investment Banker,  Cooper Cole, Toronto, ON
2014. Wilder Hobson’s Theater Absurd-o, Art Centre Nevsky 8, St. Petersburg, Russia
2015. Leftovers Again (The War With Paper, Continued), Weird Things, Toronto, ON
2018. Hoser~Glyphs, Peanuts Gallery, Vancouver, BC
2018. Puritanical Psychic Attack!, Weird Things, Toronto, ON
2019. Prestidigitateur à Trois Cartes (Mise à Jour), Toto Club, Bordeaux, FR
2020. Shoe Reviews Online And Other Replacement Works, Massy Arts, Vancouver, BC

Awards and nominations
2003 Ignatz Award nomination for Promising New Talent for story in Rosetta (Alternative Comics), Shrimpy & Paul (Highwater Books)
2005 Doug Wright nomination in Best Book for Worn Tuff Elbow #1 published by Fantagraphics Books
2005 Ignatz Award nomination for Outstanding Comic for "Worn Tuff Elbow" #1 published by Fantagraphics Books
2007 Doug Wright nomination in Best Book for Nog A Dod (editor) anthology published by Conundrum Press
2010 Doug Wright nomination in Best Book for Hot Potatoe' [sic]' published by Drawn & Quarterly
2010 Doug Wright win in Pigskin Peters Award for Hot Potato published by Drawn & Quarterly
2012 Doug Wright nomination in Pigskin Peters Award for Pure Pajamas published by Drawn & Quarterly
2012 Ignatz Award nomination in Outstanding Artist for Pure Pajamas published by Drawn & Quarterly
2016 Society of Illustrators nomination in Long Form for Stroppy published by Drawn & Quarterly
2016 Doug Wright nomination in Best Book for Stroppy'' published by Drawn & Quarterly

Solo and collaborative self-published booklets
Bloo Chip, The Fellowship Of The Ring, The Return Of The King, The Two Towers, Call Larry About The Ironing Board, Gooma, Knoze Clippah! (several varied editions), The   Layer of the Ea_th, The Stacks, Stand Tall Guru vol. 1 and vol.3, Shut-Up World, Sleepy Pie, P.M.F. #1-4, Big Boy #1-2, Musician's Cornfest Annual (several issues), Ig,  Thanksgiving Amoeba (several editions), Who Cares?, Future Man, Belly Wot Leaflet! (three issues), Hippy #1, This Booklet Contains, Alan Thick Half-Rave with Bob Hope    Featuring Jay Leno, Puffer #1-7, Portugese Shovel #1-2 [sic], Atum Bom, The Stacks, Society, Construct, Fwob Ob Obi Won, Turf Godz, Birthday Moustache, The Toe Toddler   #1, That Ol’ Drunken Puffer, Totally Psychedoolick, Swed, M.A.C.U. (several issues), There is Nothing + More!, No. 1 Cup, Kelp Stingray, Big Pile Comics, Hassle-Free, Schematic Diagrams For Proposed Objects, Arbeitees #1 and #2, Dr. Booze, Put Your Life Away, Tired of Drawing Books, The Senior Set, Dongery, Boutique Mag #2, Cowabunga  Schnauzer (Belly Wot Leaflet 2013, Special Edition), Work Ethic #1, Food Court Foodies, Shipping Saver #1, Waffle Moo-Moo Towel #1, Islade Art Fair, WHAT, Big Snork Special 2019, Piss On The Hawkin, The Polymer Imposter Vol.1 #1

External links

Samples of work from The Stacks
Lambiek Comiclopedia entry

1971 births
Living people
Alternative cartoonists
Artists from London, Ontario
Canadian cartoonists
Canadian graphic novelists